Cannabigerovarin (CBGV), the propyl homolog of cannabigerol (CBG), is a cannabinoid present in Cannabis. There is no observation related to the psychoactive or psychotropic effects of CBGV when consumed or inhaled. The possible benefits of cannabigerovarin in human bodies are painkilling and anti-inflammatory properties to treat conditions like fibromyalgia and arthritis, the treatment and improvement of the dry-skin syndrome, cancer treatment by reducing the growth of cancer cells in patients who have leukemia.  According to the pain-relieving effects of this natural cannabinoid, it can be helpful to treat patients who were undergoing drug exposure like chemotherapy or radiation therapy.  In addition, cannabigerol metabolism increases and has a better absorption from the body when paired with cannabigerovarin.

References 

Cannabinoids